Peperomia variculata is a species of herb and epiphyte in the genus Peperomia.

Etymology
variculata came from the Spanish word "varicela". Varicela means "chicken pox".

Distribution
Peperomia variculata is native to Peru. Specimens can be found at an altitude of 525–1125 meters.

Peru
Huánuco
Norte de Tingo María
Venenillo 
Junín
Cahuapanas

Description
It is a glabrous herb and epiphyte that has a slender stem. Leaves alternate broadly.

References

variculata
Flora of South America
Plants described in 1936
Taxa named by William Trelease
Flora of Peru